Gabova is a rural locality (a village) in Yorgvinskoye Rural Settlement, Kudymkarsky District, Perm Krai, Russia. The population was 22 as of 2010.

Geography 
Gabova is located 27 km north of Kudymkar (the district's administrative centre) by road. Gurina is the nearest rural locality.

References 

Rural localities in Kudymkarsky District